Colchester is the main settlement within the city area of the same name in Essex, in the East of England. It had a population of 122,000 in 2011. The demonym is Colcestrian.
 
Colchester occupies the site of Camulodunum, the first major city in Roman Britain and its first capital. Colchester therefore claims to be Britain's first city. It has been an important military base since the Roman era, with Colchester Garrison currently housing the 16th Air Assault Brigade.

The city is connected to London by the A12 road and the Great Eastern Main Line railway.

Attractions in and around the town include Colchester United Football Club, Colchester Zoo, and several art galleries. Colchester Castle was constructed in the eleventh century on earlier Roman foundations; it now contains a museum. The main campus of the University of Essex is located just outside the city. Local government is the responsibility of the City of Colchester and Essex County Council.

Name
There are several theories about the origin of the name Colchester.  Some contend that is derived from the Latin words colonia (referring to a type of Roman settlement with rights equivalent to those of Roman citizens, one of which was believed to have been founded in the vicinity of Colchester) and castra, meaning fortifications (referring to the city's walls, the oldest in Britain). The earliest forms of the name Colchester are Colenceaster and Colneceastre from the 10th century, with the modern spelling of Colchester being found in the 15th century. In this way of interpreting the name, the River Colne which runs through the city takes its name from Colonia as well. Cologne (German Köln) also gained its name from a similar etymology (from its Roman name Colonia Claudia Ara Agrippinensium).

Other etymologists are confident that the Colne's name is of Celtic (pre-Roman) origin, sharing its origin with several other rivers Colne or Clun around Britain, and that Colchester is derived from Colne and Castra. Ekwall went as far as to say "it has often been held that Colchester contains as first element [Latin] colonia ... this derivation is ruled out of court by the fact that Colne is the name of several old villages situated a good many miles from Colchester and on the Colne. The identification of Colonia with Colchester is doubtful."

The popular association of the name with King Coel has no academic merit.

History

Prehistory
The gravel hill upon which Colchester is built was formed in the Middle Pleistocene period, and was shaped into a terrace between the Anglian glaciation and the Ipswichian glaciation by an ancient precursor to the River Colne. From these deposits beneath the city have been found Palaeolithic flint tools, including at least six Acheulian handaxes. Further flint tools made by hunter gatherers living in the Colne Valley during the Mesolithic have been discovered, including a tranchet axe from Middlewick. In the 1980s an archaeological inventory showed that over 800 shards of pottery from the Neolithic, Bronze Age and early Iron Age have been found within Colchester, along with many examples of worked flint. This included a pit found at Culver Street containing a ritually placed Neolithic grooved ware pot, as well as find spots containing later Deverel-Rimbury bucket urns. Colchester is surrounded by Neolithic and Bronze Age monuments that pre-date the town, including a Neolithic henge at Tendring, large Bronze Age barrow cemeteries at Dedham and Langham, and a larger example at Brightlingsea consisting of a cluster of 22 barrows.

Celtic origins
Colchester is said to be the oldest recorded town in Britain on the grounds that it was mentioned by Pliny the Elder, who died in AD 79, although the Celtic name of the town, Camulodunon appears on coins minted by tribal chieftain Tasciovanus in the period 2010 BC. Before the Roman conquest of Britain it was already a centre of power for Cunobelin known to Shakespeare as Cymbeline king of the Catuvellauni (c. 5 BCAD 40), who minted coins there. Its Celtic name, Camulodunon, variously represented as CA, CAM, CAMV, CAMVL and CAMVLODVNO on the coins of Cunobelinus, means 'the fortress of [the war god] Camulos'. During the 30s AD Camulodunon controlled a large swathe of Southern and Eastern Britain, with Cunobelin called "King of the Britons" by Roman writers. Camulodunon is sometimes popularly considered one of many possible sites around Britain for the legendary (perhaps mythical) Camelot of King Arthur, though the name Camelot (first mentioned by the 12th century French Arthurian storyteller Chrétien de Troyes) is most likely a corruption of Camlann, a now unknown location first mentioned in the 10th century Welsh annalistic text Annales Cambriae, identified as the place where Arthur was slain in battle.

Roman period

Soon after the Roman conquest of Britain in AD 43, a Roman legionary fortress was established, the first in Britain. Later, when the Roman frontier moved outwards and the twentieth legion had moved to the west (c. AD 49), Camulodunum became a colonia named in a second-century inscription as Colonia Victricensis. This contained a large and elaborate Temple to the Divine Claudius, the largest classical-style temple in Britain, as well as at least seven other Romano-British temples. Colchester is home to two of the five Roman theatres found in Britain; the example at Gosbecks (site of the Iron Age royal farmstead) is the largest in Britain, able to seat 5,000.

Camulodunum served as a provincial Roman capital of Britain, but was attacked and destroyed during Boudica's rebellion in AD 61. Sometime after the destruction, London became the capital of the province of Britannia. Colchester's city walls c. 3,000 yd. long were built c.65–80 A.D. when the Roman town was rebuilt after the Boudicca rebellion. In 2004, Colchester Archaeological Trust discovered the remains of a Roman Circus (chariot race track) underneath the Garrison in Colchester, a unique find in Britain. The city reached its peak in the second and third centuries AD. It may have reached a population of 30,000 in that period.

In 2014 a hoard of jewellery, known as The Fenwick Hoard, named for the shop it was found beneath, was discovered in the town centre. The director of Colchester Archaeological Trust, Philip Crummy, described the hoard as being of "national importance and one of the finest ever uncovered in Britain".

Sub-Roman and Saxon period
There is evidence of hasty re-organisation of Colchester's defences around 268–82 AD, followed later, during the fourth century, by the blocking of the Balkerne Gate. John Morris suggested that the name Camelot of Arthurian legend was probably a reference to Camulodunum, the capital of Britannia in Roman times.

The archaeologist Sir Mortimer Wheeler was the first to propose that the lack of early Anglo-Saxon finds in a triangle between London, Colchester and St Albans could indicate a 'sub-Roman triangle' where British rule continued after the arrival of the Anglo-Saxons. Since then excavations have revealed some early Saxon occupation, including a fifth-century wooden hut built on the ruins of a Roman house in present-day Lion Walk. Archaeological excavations have shown that public buildings were abandoned, and is very doubtful whether Colchester survived as a settlement with any urban characteristics after the sixth century.

The chronology of its revival is obscure. But the ninth-century Historia Brittonum, attributed to Nennius, mentions the town, which it calls Cair Colun, in a list of the thirty most important cities in Britain. Colchester was in the area assigned to the Danelaw in c.880, and remained in Danish hands until 917 when it was besieged and recaptured by the army of Edward the Elder. The tenth-century Saxons called the town Colneceastre, which is directly equivalent to the Cair Colun of 'Nennius'.  The tower of Holy Trinity Church is late Saxon work.

Medieval and Tudor periods

Medieval Colchester's main landmark is Colchester Castle, which is an 11th-century Norman keep, and built on top of the vaults of the old Roman temple. There are notable medieval ruins in Colchester, including the surviving gateway of the Benedictine abbey of St John the Baptist (known locally as "St John's Abbey"), and the ruins of the Augustinian priory of St Botolph (known locally as "St Botolph's Priory"). Many of Colchester's parish churches date from this period.

Colchester's medieval town seal incorporated the biblical text Intravit ihc: in quoddam castellum et mulier quedam excepit illum 'Jesus entered a certain castle and a woman there welcomed him' (Luke 10.38).  This is a commonplace allegory in which a castle is likened to Mary's womb, and explains the name of Maidenburgh St, neighbouring the castle.

In 1189, Colchester was granted its first known royal charter by King Richard I (Richard the Lionheart), although the wording suggests that it was based on an earlier one. It granted Colchester's burgesses the right to elect bailiffs and a justice. The borough celebrated the 800th anniversary of its charter in 1989.

Colchester developed rapidly during the later 14th century as a centre of the woollen cloth industry, and became famous in many parts of Europe for its russets (fabrics of a grey-brown colour). This allowed the population to recover exceptionally rapidly from the effects of the Black Death, particularly by immigration into the town.
Rovers Tye Farm, now a pub on Ipswich Road, has been documented as being established by 1353.

By the 'New Constitutions' of 1372, a borough council was instituted; the two bailiffs who represented the borough to the king were now expected to consult sixteen ordinary councillors and eight auditors (later called aldermen). Even though Colchester's fortunes were more mixed during the 15th century, it was still a more important place by the 16th century than it had been in the 13th. In 1334 it would not have ranked among England's wealthiest fifty towns, to judge from the taxation levied that year. By 1524, however, it ranked twelfth, as measured by its assessment to a lay subsidy.

Between 1550 and 1600, a large number of weavers and clothmakers from Flanders emigrated to Colchester and the surrounding areas. They were famed for the production of "Bays and Says" cloths which were woven from wool and are normally associated with Baize and Serge although surviving examples show that they were rather different from their modern equivalents. An area in Colchester town centre is still known as the Dutch Quarter and many buildings there date from the Tudor period. During this period Colchester was one of the most prosperous wool towns in England, and was also famed for its oysters. Flemish refugees in the 1560s brought innovations that revived the local cloth trade, establishing the Dutch Bay Hall for quality control of the textiles for which Colchester became famous. The old Roman wall runs along Northgate Street in the Dutch Quarter.

In the reign of "Bloody Mary" (1553–1558) Colchester became a centre of Protestant "heresy" and in consequence at least 19 local people were burned at the stake at the Castle, at first in front, later within the walls. They are commemorated on a tablet near the altar of St Peter's Church.
(Sources: John Foxe, Book of Martyrs; Mark Byford, The Process of Reformation in a Tudor Town)

17th and 18th century

The town saw the start of the Stour Valley riots of 1642, when the town house of John Lucas, 1st Baron Lucas of Shenfield was attacked by a large crowd. In 1648, during the Second English Civil War, a Royalist army led by Lord Goring entered the town. A pursuing Parliamentary army led by Thomas Fairfax and Henry Ireton surrounded the town for eleven and a half weeks, a period known as the Siege of Colchester. It started on 13 June. The Royalists surrendered in the late summer (on 27 August Lord Goring signed the surrender document in the Kings Head Inn) and Charles Lucas and George Lisle were executed in the grounds of Colchester Castle. A small obelisk marks the spot where they fell.

Daniel Defoe mentions in A tour through England and Wales that the town lost 5259 people to the plague in 1665, "more in proportion than any of its neighbours, or than the city of London". By the time he wrote this in 1722, however, he estimated its population to be around 40,000 (including "out-villages").

Between 1797 and 1815 Colchester was the HQ of the Army's Eastern District, had a garrison of up to 6,000, and played a main role in defence against a threatened French or Dutch invasion, At various times it was the base of such celebrated officers as Lord Cornwallis, Generals Sir James Craig and David Baird, and Captain William Napier. It was in a state of alarm during the invasion threat of 1803/4, a period well chronicled by the contemporary local author Jane Taylor.

Victorian period
Colchester is noted for its Victorian architecture. Significant landmarks include the Colchester Town Hall and the Jumbo Water Tower.

In 1884, the city was struck by the Colchester earthquake, estimated to have been 4.7 on the Richter Scale causing extensive regional damage.

The Paxman diesels business has been associated with Colchester since 1865 when James Noah Paxman founded a partnership with the brothers Henry and Charles Davey ('Davey, Paxman, and Davey') and opened the Standard Ironworks. In 1925, Paxman produced its first spring injection oil engine and joined the English Electric Diesel Group in 1966later becoming part of the GEC Group. Since the 1930s the Paxman company's main business has been the production of diesel engines.

20th century and later

In the early 20th century Colchester lobbied to be the seat for a new Church of England diocese for Essex, to be split off from the existing Diocese of Rochester. The bid was unsuccessful, with county town Chelmsford forming the seat of the new diocese.

In the 2nd World War Colchester's main significance lay in its infantry and light-anti-aircraft training units, and in the Paxman factory, which supplied a large proportion of the engines for British submarines and landing craft. Occasionally bombed by stray single German aircraft in 1940 and 1941, in 1942 more serious attempts to hit its industries were made by the Luftwaffe. None of these attacks hit its target, but in the 11 August raid bombs exploded on Severall's psychiatric hospital, killing 38 elderly patients. In February 1944 a single raider caused a huge fire in the St Botolph's area which gutted warehouses, shops and part of Paxman's Britannia Works. The total wartime bombing death toll in the borough was 55.
(Sources:--Eastern Command, 11 Corps, various divisional, brigade and battalion, and Colchester Garrison war diaries in WO 166 series at National Archives, Kew; 4 Civil Defence Region reports in HO 192/193 series at National Archives; CW 1 Police Incident records at Essex County Record Office).

The University of Essex was established just outside the city boundaries at Wivenhoe Park in 1961. The £22.7M  A120 Colchester Eastern Bypass opened in June 1982.

Colchester and the surrounding area is currently undergoing significant regeneration, including controversial greenfield residential development in Mile End and Braiswick. At the time of the 2011 UK Census, Colchester and its surrounding built up area had a population of 121,859, marking a considerable rise from the previous census and with considerable development since 2001 and ongoing building plans; it has been named as one of Britain's fastest growing towns. The local football team, Colchester United, moved into a brand new stadium at Cuckoo Farm in 2008.

Colchester, Camulodunum and Colonia Victricensis forms one of 38 sites seeking World Heritage Site status, with a shortlist to be submitted to UNESCO for consideration in 2011.

On 20 May 2022, it was announced that as part of the Platinum Jubilee Civic Honours, Colchester would receive city status. It was slated to receive the status formally by letters patent on 12 September 2022, however following the death of Queen Elizabeth II, the ceremony was postponed. On 29 September 2022, the letters patent was made public, with Colchester receiving city status dated 5 September 2022 by the late Queen.

Climate

Colchester is generally regarded as having an Oceanic climate (Köppen climate classification Cfb) like the rest of the United Kingdom. Its easterly position within the British Isles makes Colchester less prone to Atlantic depressions and weather fronts but more prone to droughts. This is because, like most areas in southeast England, Colchester's weather is influenced more by Continental weather patterns than by Atlantic weather systems. This leads to a dry climate compared to the rest of the UK all year round and occasional (relative) extremes of temperatures during the year (occasional high 20°Cs/low 30°Cs during the summer) and quite a few nights below freezing during the winter months (daytime high temperatures are seldom below freezing). Any rainfall that does come from Atlantic weather systems is usually light, but a few heavy showers and thunderstorms can take place during the summer. Snow falls on average 13 days a year during winter and early spring.

Garrison 

Colchester has been an important military garrison since the Roman era. The Colchester Garrison is currently home to the 16th Air Assault Brigade. The Army's only military corrective training centre, known colloquially within the forces and locally as "The Glasshouse" after the original military prison in Aldershot, is in Berechurch Hall Road, on the outskirts of Colchester. The centre holds men and women from all three services who are sentenced to serve periods of detention.

From 1998 to 2008, the garrison area of the city underwent massive redevelopment. A lot of the Ministry of Defence land was sold for private housing development and parts of the garrison were moved. Many parts of the garrison now stand empty awaiting the second phase of the development.

Since 2006, Colchester has been one of 12 places in the UK where Royal Salutes are fired to mark Royal anniversaries and visits by foreign heads of state. From 2009, these salutes have taken place in Castle Park.

BFBS Radio broadcasts from studios on the base on 107.0FM as part of its UK Bases network

Governance

Colchester Borough Council is the local authority. The political composition of the council as of the 2021 election:

 Conservative - 23 seats
 Labour – 11 seats
 Liberal Democrats – 12 seats
 Highwoods Independents – 3 seats
 Green  - 2
Control of the council is currently held by a coalition of the Conservatives and Independents by just one seat. The Liberal Democrats, the Labour Party and the Green Party operate a combined opposition.
The city is also represented on Essex County Council, containing six County electoral divisions. Villages within the borough are represented by various parish councils. The former municipal borough of Colchester contains only one parish council (Myland Community Council formed in 1999) with the rest of Colchester Town being unparished since the parish was abolished on 1 April 1974.

The seat of local government is Colchester Town Hall, a late-Victorian baroque edifice by John Belcher. It is the latest in a series of local government buildings to have stood on the same site since the 12th century. The 162-foot clock tower was presented by James Paxman; it is topped by a figure of St Helena, who is linked by legend to the city.

The Member of Parliament for Colchester is Will Quince of the Conservative Party.

The city's former MP, Liberal Democrat Sir Bob Russell, has held the ceremonial role of High Steward of Colchester since 2015.

Demography
See Demographics of Colchester borough

Culture

Museums
Colchester houses several museums. The Castle Museum, found within Colchester Castle, features an extensive exhibit on Roman Colchester. Nearby are Hollytrees Museum, a social history museum with children's exhibits in the former home of Charles Gray, and the city's Natural History Museum, located in the former All Saints' Church. The Colchester Archaeological Trust have opened a visitor centre and museum at the former Cavalry Barracks to display finds from the Roman Circus, with replicas and models of the circus, as well as finds from the nearby Roman cemeteries. In 2014 brick and marble columns from the monumental façade of the precinct of the Temple of Claudius were discovered behind the High Street, with plans to make them visible to the public.

Gosbecks Archaeological Park
Gosbecks Archaeological Park is situated south-west of the city, and consists of a preserved Roman theatre and Romano-British temple marked out on the ground. The park was the location of a large high-status late Iron Age farmstead, known as "Cunobelin's farm" after the Catuvellauni king, whose coin moulds were found in large quantities at the site. In the Roman period the site was the location of a large Romano-British temple and Britain's largest Roman theatre, twice as large as the one in the city. The park is also close to the post-conquest Stanway burials, a Roman fort and the still-extant defensive earthworks of the Iron Age fortress (the most extensive of their kind in Britain). The Iron Age earthwork ditch and bank defences are open to the public as wooded parkland.

Arts

Opened in 1972, the Mercury Theatre is a repertory theatre. Located nearby is Colchester Arts Centre, a multi-function arts venue located in the former St Mary-at-the-Walls church, and home of the Colchester Beer Festival. The Headgate Theatre is also located in Colchester.

Firstsite is a contemporary art organisation, based in the Visual Arts Facility, which was designed by Rafael Viñoly, and opened in September 2011, at a total cost of approximately £25.5 million, £9 million more than the original estimate.

The Minories houses The Minories Galleries, which is managed by Colchester Institute and presents contemporary exhibitions by artists from the region. The building is owned by the Victor Batte-Lay Foundation.

There are several bars with live music in the city.

In 2009, an art collective called 'Slack Space' took up some of the closed-down shops in the city and converted them into art galleries with the hope of promoting art and design in the city. The Colchester School of Art, opened in 1885, is based in the Colchester Institute, near the centre of the city.

A film festival, showcasing a selection of new feature and short films from around the world and centred at the VAF, was held from to 2012 to 2017 (excluding 2016). 
The city has 12 cinema screens spread across the 8 screen Odeon, 3 screen Curzon and 1 screen in the firstsite gallery.

Sport
The city's link with football began with the amateur club Colchester Town, which was formed in 1867 and dissolved in 1937. They were succeeded by professional club Colchester United, who compete in Football League Two (as of Season 2022–23) and play home games at Colchester Community Stadium. Founded in 1937, the club entered the Football League in 1950 and reached its highest finish in 2006-07 of 10th place in the Championship. Colchester United Ladies play in the FA Women's Premier League Southern Division. Other sports teams based in the city include Colchester School of Gymnastics, Colchester Rugby Football Club, Colchester Gladiators American Football Club, Colchester Weight Lifting Club, Colchester Powerlifting Club (ColPower) and Colchester & East Essex Cricket Club. Essex County Cricket Club play some of their home games at Castle Park Cricket Ground, home of Colchester & East Essex.

Sports facilities in Colchester include the sports centre, Colchester Sports Park, Colchester Leisure World, Colchester Garrison Athletics Stadium (a co-operative facility used by both the army and civilian population) and a skatepark.

Other
The city centre is home to upmarket department store Fenwick (still referred to by locals by its former name of Williams & Griffin (Willie Gees)), Primark, H&M, Boots, WH Smith and many local independent stores. The 90-year-old M&S store on the High Street relocated to Stanway to the west of the city in 2022 adding to the large empty retail stores of the former Co-op and Debenhams in the heart of the city.

Landmarks

Colchester War Memorial 
Colchester suffered in the First World War, losing some 1,248 in the conflict. As early as 1918 prominent voices in the city were calling for a war memorial, with Councillor Edgar A. Hunt making the first formal proposition in an open letter to the press published on Christmas Day of that year. Shortly after the publication of the letter, a committee was set up to decide the form of the monument, with several practical schemes favoured by the working class of the city. The committee formed to choose a proposal decided on a sculptural monument on 16 May 1919 with a vote of 7 to 9. Following a visit to the Royal Academy's War Memorial Exhibition the sculptor Henry Charles Fehr was chosen to undertake the work, for which he was paid £3,000. The memorial consists of three human figures on a sculptural pedestal. The figures are of Saint George, an allegorical representation of peace and the Goddess Nike.

Roman walls

Construction of the walls of Colchester took place between 65 and 80 AD, shortly after the destruction of the undefended colonia by Boudicca, and they continued in use until after the Siege of Colchester in 1648. Two large stretches of the wall are still standing on the west and north sides and a number of fragments are visible along the rest of the circuit. A notable survival is the Balkerne Gate, which is the earliest and most complete Roman gateway in the United Kingdom. A circular walk of nearly  follows the course of the wall and the surviving portions.

"Jumbo" water tower

Completed in 1883 when the Town Council took over Colchester's water supply, the  water tower was originally called the "Balkerne Water Tower", but soon became known as "Jumbo" because of its large size, which prompted the addition of an elephant-shaped weather vane at its peak. The tower was decommissioned in 1987 and has had several private owners pending redevelopment.

Colchester Town Hall

The town hall is built on the site of the original moot hall, first recorded in 1277 and demolished in 1843. Replacing a Victorian town hall which had become unstable, work on the present building started in 1897 to the design of John Belcher in the Edwardian Baroque style, and was opened in 1902 by former prime minister, the Earl of Rosebery. The building dominates the High Street and the 192-foot (58.5-metre) Victoria Tower is widely visible. The tower was intended to commemorate the Diamond Jubilee of Queen Victoria and was funded by a donation from James Noah Paxman, the founder of Davey, Paxman & Co. It features four allegorical figures by L J Watts representing engineering, military defence, agriculture and fishery. At the top of the tower is a large bronze figure representing Saint Helena (the patron saint of Colchester) holding the True Cross; a local story says that a councillor was dispatched to Italy to find a statue of the saint, but could only find one of the Virgin Mary, which then had to be modified locally.

Education

Secondary education
As is the case for the rest of Essex, Colchester's state schooling operates a two-tier system. Two of the city's secondary schools are selective, Colchester Royal Grammar School and Colchester County High School for Girls, the remainder being comprehensives. Comprehensive secondary schools include The Gilberd School, Colchester Academy, Philip Morant School and College, St Helena School, St Benedict's Catholic College, Thomas Lord Audley School and the Paxman Academy.

Private schools
Private schools in Colchester include St. Mary's School, Oxford House School and Colchester High School.

Tertiary
The University of Essex is located to the east of Colchester in Wivenhoe Park, in the civil parish of Wivenhoe. Other tertiary institutions include Colchester Sixth Form College and Colchester Institute.

Transport

Buses
Colchester's bus services are operated primarily by First Essex and Arriva Colchester, as well as by Hedingham & Chambers, Beeston's, Ipswich Buses and Panther Travel (Essex). The bus station is located in Osborne Street, on the southern edge of the city centre. Key routes include the 71 to Chelmsford and the 74 to Clacton-on-Sea.

Railway
Colchester Town and Hythe stations are on the Sunshine Coast Line operated by Greater Anglia, and linked to the rest of the network at Colchester North station, which lies just outside this area.

Roads
Colchester is linked to London and East Anglia by the A12, which bypasses the town to the north and east, and is the region's main trunk route. The A120 connects Colchester with Harwich in the east and Stansted Airport and the M11 motorway in the west.

References in literature
The Roman historian Tacitus mentions Colchester (Camulodunum) in The Annals of Imperial Rome. In Book XIV he describes how '...the Roman ex-soldiers...had recently established a settlement at Camulodunum', later burned down in the Iceni rebellion.

It is the only town in Britain to have been explicitly mentioned in George Orwell's novel Nineteen Eighty-Four as being the target of a nuclear attack during the (fictional) Atomic Wars of the 1950s.

In popular culture
 
Colchester is reputed to be the home of three of the best known English nursery rhymes: 'Old King Cole', 'Humpty Dumpty' and 'Twinkle, Twinkle Little Star', although the legitimacy of all three claims is disputed.

Local legend places Colchester as the seat of King Cole (or Coel) of the rhyme Old King Cole, a legendary ancient king of Britain. The name Colchester is from Latin: the place-name suffixes chester, cester, and caster derive from the Latin word castrum (fortified place). In folk etymology the name Colchester was thought of as meaning Cole's Castle , though this theory does not have academic support. In the legend Helena, the daughter of Cole, married the Roman senator Constantius Chlorus, who had been sent by Rome as an ambassador and was named as Cole's successor. Helena's son became Emperor Constantine I. Helena was canonised as Saint Helena of Constantinople and is credited with finding the true cross and the remains of the Magi. She is now the patron saint of Colchester. This is recognised in the emblem of Colchester: a cross and three crowns. The Mayor's medallion contains a Byzantine style icon of Saint Helena. A local secondary school – St Helena's – is named after her, and her statue is atop the town hall, although local legend is that it was originally a statue of Blessed Virgin Mary which was later fitted with a cross.

Colchester is a widely credited source of the rhyme Humpty Dumpty. During the siege of Colchester in the Civil War, a Royalist sniper known as One-Eyed Thompson sat in the belfry of the church of St Mary-at-the-Walls (Humpty Dumpty sat on the wall) and was given the nickname Humpty Dumpty, most likely because of his size, Humpty Dumpty being a common insult for the overweight. Thompson was shot down (Humpty Dumpty had a great fall) and, shortly after, the town was lost to the Parliamentarians (all the king's horses and all the king's men / couldn't put Humpty together again.) Another version says that Humpty Dumpty was a cannon on the top of the church. The church of St Mary-at-the-Walls still retains its Norman tower until the top few feet, which are a Georgian repair.

The third rhyme said to have come from Colchester is Twinkle Twinkle Little Star, which was written by Jane Taylor  who lived in the city's Dutch Quarter, and published in 1806 with the title "The Star".

Colchester has also been suggested as one of the potential sites of Camelot, on account of having been the capital of Roman Britain and its ancient name of Camulodunum: this is not considered likely by academics, as in Arthurian times Colchester was under Saxon control.

The first part of Daniel Defoe's Moll Flanders was set in Colchester.

Colchester was also a named line of lathe machinery.

In the book Nineteen Eighty-Four Colchester was the scene of a nuclear detonation.

The Doctor Who episodes The Lodger and Closing Time are set in Colchester, although they were filmed in Cardiff.

In the Asterix comic book Asterix in Britain the Camulodunum rugby team wins a game against Durovernum (Roman name for Canterbury). The uniforms worn during the match in the book are similar to the modern kit of Colchester United.

Colchester appears in the video game Assassin's Creed Valhalla, with the city recreated as it was in the early medieval period.

Colcestrians

People of note that have lived in Colchester include:

George Biddell Airy (1801–1892) – Astronomer Royal, attended Colchester Royal Grammar School 1814–1819
Cuthbert Alport (1912–1998) – Cabinet Minister, High Commissioner to the Federation of Rhodesia and Nyasaland, High Steward of Colchester
Ken Aston (1915–2001) – football referee, responsible for many important developments in football refereeing
Thomas Audley (1488–1544) – Lord Chancellor of England 1533–44, founder of Magdalene College, Cambridge
John Ball (died 1381) – leader of the Peasants' Revolt of 1381
Thomas Miller Beach aka Henri Le Caron (1841-1894) - spy, who did much to thwart the objectives of the Fenians
John Beche (died 1539) – last abbot of St John's Abbey, Colchester
Crispin Bonham-Carter (born 1969) – actor and theatre director
Ali Carter (born 1979) – professional snooker player
Graham Coxon (born 1969) – musician and Blur lead guitarist
Stella Creasy (born 1977) - MP for Walthamstow, went to school in Colchester
Cunobelin (died before 43 AD) – King of the Britons
Darren Day (born 1968) – actor and television presenter
Daniel Defoe (1660–1731) – trader, writer, journalist, pamphleteer and spy, most famous for his novel Robinson Crusoe
Eudo Dapifer (died 1120) – oversaw the building of Colchester Castle and was its first steward
Ben Foakes (born 1993) - cricketer
Neil Foster (born 1962) – cricketer
William Gilbert (1544–1603) – scientist, pioneer in the field of magnetism and court physician to Elizabeth I and James I
William Gull (1816–1890) – Physician-in-Ordinary to Queen Victoria; Governor of Guy's Hospital; researched and named anorexia nervosa
William Hale (1797–1870) – early rocket engineer
Samuel Harsnett (1561–1631) – writer and Archbishop of York
Hermann Arthur Jahn (1907–1979) - scientist, discovered the Jahn-Teller effect
Helen Mary Jones (Born 1960) - Member of the Welsh Senedd (1993 to 2011 and 2018–2021)
Klaus Kinski (1926–1991) – actor, director, former German POW in Colchester during the World War II
Charles Lucas (1613–1648) – Royalist soldier in the English Civil War and Siege of Colchester
Alfred Lungley (1905–1989) – awarded the George Cross after the Quetta earthquake of 1935
Bernard Mason (1895–1981) – businessman, philanthropist, clock collector
Philip Morant (1700–1770) – parish priest of St Mary-at-the-Walls, author of The History & Antiquities of the County of Essex 
Chris Morris (born 1962), English satirical comedian, writer, and director
Dermot O'Leary (born 1972) - English broadcaster and presenter
Roger Penrose (born 1931) – mathematical physicist and philosopher
Sam Pilgrim (born 1990) – freeride mountain biker
Dave Rowntree (born 1964) – musician, drummer for Blur 
Anne Schwegmann-Fielding (born 1967) – sculptor and mosaic artist
Jeremy Spake (born 1969) – TV personality and presenter
Charles Spurgeon (1834–1892) – Particular Baptist preacher, known as the "Prince of Preachers"
Jane Taylor (1783–1824) – poet and author of the lyrics to Twinkle Twinkle Little Star
Gerald Templer (1898–1979) – British army officer
Margaret Thatcher (1925–2013) – Prime Minister
Archibald Wavell (1883–1950) – senior officer of the British Army and the penultimate Viceroy of India
Mary Whitehouse (1910–2001) – Christian morality campaigner
Laming Worthington-Evans (1868–1931) – Secretary of State for War, Postmaster General

Twin towns 

Colchester's twin towns are:

 Wetzlar, Germany, since 1969
 Avignon, France, since 1972
 Imola, Italy, since 1997
 Yangzhou, China, since 2015

See also
Statistics of Colchester
Coat of arms of Colchester
Geography of the United Kingdom#Geology
List of natural disasters in the United Kingdom and preceding states
Military history of the United Kingdom during World War II
Colchester churches
Church of St Leonard at the Hythe, Colchester
Colchester power station

Notes

References

External links

Colchester Borough Council

 
Towns in Essex
Cities in the East of England
Coloniae (Roman)
Former national capitals
Market towns in Essex
Ports and harbours of Essex
Trading posts of the Hanseatic League
Unparished areas in Essex
Roman legionary fortresses in England
Former civil parishes in Essex